Dieter Langewiesche (born 11 January 1943 in Sankt Sebastian, Mariazell) is a German historian. Langewiesche is one of the leading experts on the history of nationalism and liberalism.

In 1996 he received the Gottfried Wilhelm Leibniz Prize.

Works

In English
 Liberalism in Germany. Translated by Christiane Banerji. Princeton University Press, Princeton NJ 2000, 
 "Europe 1848. Revolution and Reform." Edited by Dieter Dowe, Heinz-Gerhard Haupt, D. L. and Jonathan Sperber, Berghahn Books New York – Oxford 2001. 
 "Territorial revisionism and the allies of Germany in the Second World War." Edited by Marina Cattaruzza, Stefan Dyroff & Dieter Langewiesche. New York: Berghahn Books 2012.  (PB)

References

1943 births
Living people
20th-century German historians
21st-century German historians